The black-dotted tree frog (Litoria nigropunctata) is a species of frog in the subfamily Pelodryadinae. It is found in New Guinea (both in the Indonesian part (West Papua) and in Papua New Guinea) and some adjacent islands, including Yapen, its type locality, and Gebe in the Maluku Islands.
Its natural habitats are tropical moist lowland forests and slow flowing rivers.

References

Litoria
Amphibians of Papua New Guinea
Amphibians of Western New Guinea
Taxonomy articles created by Polbot
Amphibians described in 1875